The Office of the Sheriff of New South Wales is an agency of the Government of New South Wales, Australia, forming part of the Department of Communities and Justice and headed by the State's Sheriff. The current Sheriff is Tracey Hall PSM.

Sheriff's Officers are defined as Law Enforcement Officers under the Crimes Act 1900. They support the work of the State's court system, providing security at court complexes; enforcing writs, warrants and property seizure orders; and managing the jury system. The Office was established in 1824; prior to this its functions were exercised by the fledgling colony's provost marshal. The sheriff's Office managed NSW prisons until 1874.

Sheriffs of New South Wales

See also 
 Coroner's Court of New South Wales
 Corrective Services NSW
 Supreme Court of New South Wales

References

External links
 History of the Office of the Sheriff of New South Wales

Government of New South Wales
Sheriffs
Government agencies of New South Wales